Chelsey Edwards (born 15 June 2001) is a New Zealand swimmer. She competed in the women's 50 metre freestyle at the 2019 World Aquatics Championships where she did not advance to compete in the semi-finals. She also competed in the women's 4 × 200 metre freestyle relay where New Zealand finished in 10th place in the heats.

References

External links
 

2001 births
Living people
New Zealand female swimmers
Place of birth missing (living people)
21st-century New Zealand women